Paul Bulcke (born 8 September 1954) is a Belgian businessman who is the chairman and former CEO of Nestlé.

Early life
He graduated as a commercial engineer at the Katholieke Universiteit Leuven and is an alumnus of the Vlerick Leuven Gent Management School. He also attended the program for executive development at the Swiss leading business school International Institute for Management Development (IMD) in Lausanne.

Career

In 1979, aged 25, he started working for the Nestlé group and worked in different countries, including Switzerland, Spain, Belgium, Peru, Ecuador, Chile, Portugal, Czech Republic and Germany. Before his appointment as CEO of Nestlé, he was the executive vice president of its Americas divisions.

Bulcke has described Nestlé under his tenure as 'une force tranquille' (English: 'calm strength'). He is known for having a reserved, quiet personal manner.

He was succeeded as CEO by Ulf Mark Schneider in January 2017.

Water sustainability

On 30 August 2012, Bulcke was quoted as saying: "If something isn't given a value, people tend to waste it. Water is our most useful resource, but those using it often don’t even cover the costs of its infrastructure. Fresh water is being massively overused at nature's expense, but it seems only a global crisis will make us realise the importance of the issue. What is environmentally unsustainable today will become socially unsustainable in the future."

Awards and honours
On 25 May 2012, he received the VMA Award from the Vlerick Leuven Gent Management School for his "lifelong career, which has been distinguished by sustained integrity, exceptional management capacity and inspiring leadership".

Personal life
He is married, has three children, and speaks six languages: Dutch, French, Spanish, Portuguese, German and English. He likes to go sailing as a hobby.

References

Sources
  Belg Paul Bulcke wordt topman Nestlé
  Paul Bulcke
 Paul Bulcke

External links
 Paul Bulcke
 

1954 births
Living people
People from Roeselare
Belgian businesspeople
Belgian chairpersons of corporations
Belgian chief executives
KU Leuven alumni
Directors of Nestlé
Ghent University alumni
Chairmen of Nestlé
Vlerick Business School alumni
International Institute for Management Development alumni